Cppcheck is a static code analysis tool for the C and C++ programming languages. It is a versatile tool that can check non-standard code. The creator and lead developer is Daniel Marjamäki.

Cppcheck is free software under the GNU General Public License.

Features 

Cppcheck supports a wide variety of static checks that may not be covered by the compiler itself. These checks are static analysis checks that can be performed at a source code level. The program is directed towards static analysis checks that are rigorous, rather than heuristic in nature.

Some of the checks that are supported include:

 Automatic variable checking
 Bounds checking for array overruns
 Classes checking (e.g. unused functions, variable initialization and memory duplication)
 Usage of deprecated or superseded functions according to Open Group
 Exception safety checking, for example usage of memory allocation and destructor checks
 Memory leaks, e.g. due to lost scope without deallocation
 Resource leaks, e.g. due to forgetting to close a file handle
 Invalid usage of Standard Template Library functions and idioms
 Dead code elimination using unusedFunction option
 Miscellaneous stylistic and performance errors

As with many analysis programs, there are many unusual cases of programming idioms that may be acceptable in particular target cases or outside of the programmer's scope for source code correction. A study conducted in March 2009 identified several areas where false positives were found by Cppcheck, but did not specify the program version examined. Cppcheck has been identified for use in systems such as CERNs 4DSOFT meta analysis package, for code verification in high energy particle detector readout devices, system monitoring software for radio telescopes as well as in error analysis of large projects, such as OpenOffice.org and the Debian archive.

Development 

The project is actively under development and is actively maintained in different distributions. It has found valid bugs in a number of popular projects such as the Linux kernel and MPlayer.

Plugins 

Plugins for the following IDEs or text editors exist
 CLion
 Code::Blocks - integrated.
 CodeLite - integrated.
 Eclipse
 Emacs
 gedit
 Hudson
 Jenkins
 Kate
 KDevelop
 Qt Creator
 Sublime Text
 Visual Studio
 Yasca

See also 

 List of tools for static code analysis

References

External links 
 

Cross-platform free software
Free software programmed in C++
Free software testing tools
Software using the GPL license
Static program analysis tools